The 2019 My Bariatric Solutions 300 was a NASCAR Xfinity Series race held on March 30, 2019, at Texas Motor Speedway in Fort Worth, Texas. Contested over 200 laps on the 1.5-mile (2.4 km) intermediate quad-oval, it was the sixth race of the 2019 NASCAR Xfinity Series season.

Background

Track

Texas Motor Speedway is a speedway located in the northernmost portion of the U.S. city of Fort Worth, Texas – the portion located in Denton County, Texas. The reconfigured track measures  with banked 20° in turns 1 and 2 and banked 24° in turns 3 and 4. Texas Motor Speedway is a quad-oval design, where the front straightaway juts outward slightly. The track layout is similar to Atlanta Motor Speedway and Charlotte Motor Speedway.

Entry list

Practice

First practice

Final practice

Qualifying

Qualifying results

Garrett Smithley and Tommy Joe Martins started at the rear for unapproved adjustments to their cars after qualifying.
Gray Gaulding, Timmy Hill, Josh Williams, Jeff Green, and Ronnie Bassett, Jr. were sent to the back of the field for missing the drivers meeting.

Race

Summary 
Christopher Bell led the field to the green flag, and would remain as the race leader until after Stage 1. Kyle Busch then took the lead from Bell while Tyler Hill and David Starr were involved in a minor accident. Both would continue the race. Busch lost the lead when a caution occurred after Brad Keselowski was tapped by Justin Haley and crashed into the wall. Noah Gragson took the lead afterwards, but Ryan Sieg took it under a caution caused by Ray Black Jr. Sieg would win Stage 2 afterwards. Tyler Reddick and Bell would later trade the lead while Brandon Jones and Cole Custer got into a crash and took each other out of the race. Busch took the lead from Bell with 9 laps to go and held off Reddick to earn his third victory in the series for the year.

Stage Results

Stage One
Laps: 45

Stage Two
Laps: 45

Final Stage Results

Stage Three
Laps: 110

. – Qualified for Dash 4 Cash prize money in the next race.

References

My Bariatric Solutions 300
2010s in Fort Worth, Texas
My Bariatric Solutions 300
NASCAR races at Texas Motor Speedway
2019 NASCAR Xfinity Series